The list of shipwrecks in June 1885 includes ships sunk, foundered, grounded, or otherwise lost during June 1885.

1 June

2 June

3 June

4 June

5 June

7 June

8 June

10 June

11 June

12 June

19 June

20 June

21 June

23 June

24 June

25 June

27 June

30 June

Unknown date

References

1885-06
Maritime incidents in June 1885